Vakfıkebir is a town and district of Trabzon Province in the Black Sea region of Turkey. The mayor is Muhammet Balta (AKP).

Cuisine of Vakfıkebir
Vakfıkebir bread
Vakfıkebir butter (Vakfıkebir tereyağı)

Notable natives
Volkan Bekçi (1987– ), footballer
Tayfun Cora (1983– ), footballer of Trabzonspor
Rahman Oğuz Kobya (1988– ), footballer of Adanaspor
Erman Öncü (1976– ), retired footballer, currently scholar for physical education and sports at the Black Sea Technical University
Muhammet Özdin (1978– ), footballer
Osman Şirin (1943– ), former justice of the High Court of Appeals of Turkey
Necip Torumtay (1926–2011), former Chief of the General Staff of Turkey

References

External links

District governor's official website 
District municipality's official website 

Populated places in Trabzon Province
Black Sea port cities and towns in Turkey
Fishing communities in Turkey
Populated coastal places in Turkey
Districts of Trabzon Province